Simon Charbonneau-Campeau (born May 2, 1988) is a Canadian football wide receiver who is currently a free agent. He was selected 25th overall by the Hamilton Tiger-Cats in the 2012 CFL Draft and was signed on May 30, 2012. After the 2011 CIS season, he was ranked as the ninth best player in the Canadian Football League’s Amateur Scouting Bureau final rankings for players eligible in the 2012 CFL Draft, and fourth by players in Canadian Interuniversity Sport. He played CIS football with the Sherbrooke Vert et Or.

Professional career

Hamilton Tiger-Cats 
Charbonneau-Campeau was drafted by the Hamilton Tiger-Cats of the Canadian Football League in the 4th round of the 2012 CFL Draft. In his first 2 seasons with the Ti-Cats he caught a total of 9 passes for 115 yards with no touchdowns.

Calgary Stampeders 
On January 6, 2014, Charbonneau-Campeau was traded to the Calgary Stampeders in exchange for non-import WR Spencer Armstrong.

References

External links
Calgary Stampeders bio

1988 births
Living people
Players of Canadian football from Quebec
Canadian football wide receivers
Sherbrooke Vert et Or football players
Hamilton Tiger-Cats players
People from Saint-Jean-sur-Richelieu
French Quebecers